Auto Italia magazine was first published in March 1995, as the world’s first specialist publication to focus on Italian automotive design, motoring heritage and engineering. The founder of the magazine is Phil Ward.
The magazine is now owned and run by Michael Ward. 

Auto Italia’s features are produced by a dedicated group of British and Italian writers, who all own, restore or race Italian cars.

References

External links
 Official website

1995 establishments in the United Kingdom
Automobile magazines published in the United Kingdom
Monthly magazines published in the United Kingdom
Magazines established in 1995
Mass media in Hertfordshire